The sertão (plural sertões) is the "hinterland" or "backcountry". In Brazil, it refers both to one of the four sub-regions of the Northeast Region of Brazil (similar to the specific association of "outback" with Australia in English) or the hinterlands of the country in general. Northeast Brazil is largely covered in a scrubby upland forest called a caatingas. Its borders are not precise. It is an economically poor region that is well-known in Brazilian culture, with a rich history and much folklore, something like the American South. The sertão is also detailed within the famous book of Brazilian literature Os Sertões (The Backlands), which was written by the Brazilian author Euclides da Cunha.

Originally the term referred to the vast hinterlands of Asia and South America that Portuguese explorers encountered. In Brazil, it referred to backlands away from the Atlantic coastal regions where the Portuguese first settled in South America in the early sixteenth century. A Brazilian historian once referred to colonial life in Brazil as a "civilization of crabs", as most settlers clung to the shoreline, with few trying to make inroads into the sertão. In modern terms, "sertão" refers to a semi-arid region in northeastern Brazil, comprising parts of the states of Alagoas, Bahia, Pernambuco, Paraíba, Rio Grande do Norte, Ceará, Maranhão, Piauí, Sergipe, and Minas Gerais.

Geographically, the sertão consists mainly of low uplands that form part of the Brazilian highlands. In the north, the sertão extends to the northern coastal plains of Rio Grande do Norte state, while to the south it ends gradually in the northern part of Minas Gerais.

Two major rivers cross the sertão, the Jaguaribe and further east the Piranhas, and to the south, the larger São Francisco River is in part in the sertão. Smaller rivers dry up at the end of the rainy season.

The term sertão is also used in Portuguese to refer to the Brazilian hinterland in general, regardless of region. It is this sense that corresponds to sertão music, música sertaneja, roughly "country music". To avoid ambiguity, the region in the northeast is sometimes called the sertão nordestino, while the Brazilian hinterland may also be called the sertânia, the land of sertões.

Climate and vegetation

Because the sertão lies just south of the equator, temperatures are nearly uniform throughout the year and are typically tropical, often extremely hot in the west.

However, the sertão is distinctive in its low rainfall compared to other areas of Brazil. Because of the relatively cool temperatures in the South Atlantic Ocean, the intertropical convergence zone remains north of the region for most of the year, so that most of the year is very dry.

This season extends from January to April in the west, but in the eastern sertão it generally occurs from March to June. However, rainfall is extremely erratic and in some years the rains are minimal, leading to catastrophic drought, while in others rains are extremely heavy and floods occur. This variability has caused extreme famines among subsistence farmers in the region, exacerbated by the extreme imbalance of land ownership throughout the sertão. The worst of these famines, between 1877 and 1879, was said to have killed over half the region's population.

In its natural state, the sertão was covered by a distinctive scrubby caatinga vegetation, consisting generally of low thorny bushes adapted to the extreme climate. Several species of tree in the caatinga, such as the cashew, have become valuable horticultural plants. Most of the sertão vegetation is now substantially degraded as a result of centuries of cattle ranching or clearing for cotton farming.

Parts of the sertão are recognized as a biodiversity hot-spot because of its unique flora.

See also 
 Agreste
 Brazil Socio-Geographic Division
 Brazilian literature
 Caatinga
 Drought
 History of Brazil
 Os Sertões, a classic book about the sertão.
 Tieta do Agreste, a Brazilian novel and film

References

Sources

Nonfiction 

 Michael H. Glantz; Currents of Change: El Niño's Impact on Climate and Society; published 1996 by Cambridge University Press. .
 Michael H. Glantz (ed.); Drought Follows The Plow: Cultivating Marginal Areas; published 1994 by Cambridge University Press. .
 Fagan, Brian; Floods, Famines, and Emperors: El Niño and the Fate of Civilizations; published 2000 by Basic Books. .
 Nicholas G. Arons; Waiting for Rain: The Politics and Poetry of Drought in Northeast Brazil; published 2004 by University of Arizona Press. .
 Euclides da Cunha, Rebellion in the Backlands (Os Sertões), 1902

Fiction 

 Graciliano Ramos, Vidas Secas ("Barren Lives"), novel

Brazilian literature
Climate of Brazil
Droughts
Northeast Region, Brazil
Words and phrases with no direct English translation